Ian Wallace is the name of:

Arts and entertainment
Ian Wallace (author) (1912–1998), science fiction author
Ian Wallace (drummer) (1946–2007), drummer with King Crimson, Bob Dylan, and many others
Ian Wallace (illustrator) (born 1950), illustrator of children's books
Ian Wallace (photographer) (born 1972), Tasmanian landscape photographer
Ian Wallace (singer) (1919–2009), singer and contestant on My Music

Other
Ian Wallace (ornithologist) (1933–2021), British ornithologist and natural history author
Ian Wallace (artist) (born 1943), pioneer of Vancouver's conceptual art movement
Ian Wallace (Australian footballer) (born 1950), Australian footballer for Footscray
Ian Wallace (footballer, born 1956), Scottish international footballer